Balanos Vasilopoulos (1694–1760) was a Greek Orthodox cleric, author, mathematician, physicist, and philosopher.  He is known for attempting to solve doubling the cube.  He was one of the most influential Greek mathematicians of the 18th century.  His teacher was the notable scientist Methodios Anthrakites.  He made a significant contribution to the Modern Greek Enlightenment during the Ottoman occupation of the Greek world.

Life
Balanos was born in Ioannina, a major center of the Greek Enlightenment movement during that time. He was a student of Methodios Anthrakites director of the local Gouma (later Balaneios) school. As a teacher, he initially became director of the school Epifaneios Igoumenos (1719–1734) and then the Gouma. Both schools were the most prestigious in Ioannina.

Regarding the Greek language question, he supported the conservative party and teaching classical Greek in education.  Eugenios Voulgaris accused Balanos of not supporting the progressive Demotic. In ca. 1760 his son Kosmas Balanos succeeded him as schoolmaster of the Gouma School.

Work

Because he experienced the Methodios Affair first hand he was a strict teacher of Korydalism.  On the other hand, he expanded and reprinted the work of his teacher Methodios Anthrakites The Way of Mathematics (1749). This was the first handbook in the field of mathematics published in Greek during the Ottoman occupation. He also wrote the following, and various other books of less significance:

Έκθεσις ακριβεστάτη της αριθμητικής (Precise Exposition of Arithmetic), Venice, 1803
Ερμηνεία εις τους αφορισμούς του Ιπποκράτους (Interpretation of the Aphorisms of Hippocrates)

Balanos claimed to have solved the problem of doubling the cube, i.e. finding the cube root of 2 using ruler and compasses. He published this in Venice in 1756, and attempted to gain international recognition for his solution from the community of mathematicians, and in particular Leonhard Euler and the members of the Saint Petersburg Academy of Sciences. His son Kosmas Balanos rejected the solution in a work published in 1816 after his own death, Αντιπελάργησις (Antipelargisis, Against the Stork). The problem was later proved to be impossible.

References

1694 births
1760 deaths
People of the Modern Greek Enlightenment
Greek logicians
Writers from Ioannina
Greek mathematicians
18th-century Greek philosophers
Ottoman Ioannina
Scientists from Ioannina
18th-century Greek scientists
18th-century Greek educators
18th-century Greek mathematicians
18th-century Greek physicists